José Vieira Couto de Magalhães (1 November 1837 - 14 September 1898) was a Brazilian politician, military officer, writer and folklorist.

Magalhães began his studies at Mariana Seminar. He studied mathematics at the Military Academy of Rio de Janeiro and attended the course in Field Artillery in London. He graduated from in law at São Paulo Law School in 1859.

Couto de Magalhães knew the interior of Brazil and was the initiator of steam navigation in the Brazilian Highlands. He has advised the State and MP for Goiás and Mato Grosso. He was president of the provinces of Goiás, January 8, 1863 to 5 April 1864, Pará, of July 29, 1864 to May 8, 1866, Mato Grosso, of February 2, 1867 a 13 April 1868 and São Paulo, from June 10 to November 16, 1889, during which the republic was proclaimed. Arrested and sent to Rio de Janeiro, Magalhães was released in recognition of his huge culture and actions of society for clearing the Brazilian backlands.

Magalhães spoke French, English, German, Italian, Tupi and numerous indigenous dialects. he was the one who started the folklore studies in Brazil, publishing O Selvagem (The Wild) (1876) and Testes de antropologia (Anthropology testing) (1894), among others.

He founded in 1885 the first astronomical observatory in the state of São Paulo, at his farm in Great Bridge on the River Tietê.

Couto de Magalhães is the patron in the following academies of letters:

chair 31 of Academia Tocantinense de Letras;
chair 19 of Academia Matogrossense de Letras;
chair 11 of  Academia Sul-matogrossense de Letras.

The cities of Couto de Magalhães de Minas in Minas Gerais and Couto de Magalhães in Tocantins are named after him.

References

1837 births
1898 deaths
People from Diamantina
Governors of Goiás
Governors of Pará
Governors of Mato Grosso
Governors of São Paulo (state)
Liberal Party (Brazil) politicians
Brazilian folklorists
Brazilian essayists
19th-century Brazilian lawyers
Brazilian generals